The 2012 Tour de Luxembourg cycling race  was the 72nd running of the Tour de Luxembourg. It was part of the 2012 UCI Europe Tour and classed as a 2.HC event. It was won by Jakob Fuglsang from Denmark, a member of the Luxembourg-based team, .

Schedule

Teams

Stages
Key: 
: Leader and eventual winner of General Classification, based on total time.
: Leader and eventual winner of points classification, based on points given for finishing position on each mass start stage.
: Leader and eventual winner of climbers' classification, based on points gained on passing hilltops.
: Leader and eventual winner of young riders' classification, based on total time, but restricted to riders under 25 at beginning of year.

Prologue
30 May 2012 – Luxembourg,  individual time trial (ITT)

Stage 1
31 May 2012 – Luxembourg to Hesperange,

Stage 2
1 June 2012 – Schifflange to Leudelange,

Stage 3
2 June 2012 – Eschweiler to Differdange,

Stage 4
3 June 2012 – Mersch to Luxembourg, 

Stage results were taken from the first passage through the finish line for safety reasons due to poor weather conditions.

Classification leadership

References
General

Specific

Tour de Luxembourg
Tour de Luxembourg
Tour de Luxembourg